Nicholas Ball (died 1609) served as Lord Mayor of Dublin, and MP for Dublin in the Parliament of Ireland. He was from a wealthy Irish Merchant family: his father Bartholomew Ball and brother Walter Ball were also mayors of Dublin. Unlike his brother who converted to Anglicanism, Nicholas remained a Roman Catholic like his martyred mother Blessed Margaret Ball. He married Begnet Luttrell and they had three children, Margaret, Jane and Bartholomew, They lived near Kells, County Meath.

Nicholas served as Master of the Merchants Guild, Sheriff of Dublin City, an Alderman of Dublin from 1574 and Mayor of Dublin from 1582 to 1583. During his time as Mayor he tried to have his aged mother released from Dublin Castle, where she had been imprisoned for recusancy on the orders of his brother Walter, but Walter, who seems to have been determined that their mother must die in prison, managed to thwart his efforts, and she died, still a prisoner, in 1584. In 1585 he was elected to serve in the Irish House of Commons for Dublin. 
He died in 1609 and is buried in St. Audoen's Church, Dublin.

References

Lord Mayors of Dublin
1609 deaths
Year of birth unknown
Irish MPs 1585–1586